Sapotra is a constituency of the Rajasthan Legislative Assembly covering the Sapotra Tehsil in the Karauli district of Rajasthan, India.

Sapotra is one of eight assembly constituencies in the Karauli–Dholpur (Lok Sabha constituency). Currently this seat is represented by Indian National Congress candidate Ramesh Chand Meena, who won in last Assembly election of 2018 Rajasthan Legislative Assembly election by defeating Bharatiya Janta Party candidate Golma Devi Meena by a margin of 14,104 votes.

Geographical scope
The constituency comprises parts of   Sapotra Tehsil, Mandrail Tehsil, Karauli Tehsil (Partly) (1) ILRC Maholi (2) ILRC Kailadevi

Member of the Legislative Assembly

Election Results

2018 Assembly Election Result
In 2018, Sapotra legislative assembly constituency had total 2,49,633 electors. Total number of valid vote was 1,70,763. Indian National Congress candidate Ramesh Chand Meena won and became MLA from this seat third time continuously. He secured total 76,399 votes. Bharatiya Janata Party candidate Golma Devi Meena stood second with total 62,295 votes. He lost by 14,104 votes.

2013 Assembly Election Result
In 2013, Sapotra legislative assembly constituency had total 2,13,158 electors. Total number of valid vote was 1,42,681. Indian National Congress candidate Ramesh Chand Meena won and became MLA from this seat. He secured total 52,555 votes. Bharatiya Janata Party candidate Rishikesh stood second with total 46,323 votes. He lost by 6,232 votes.

2008 Assembly Election Result
In 2008, Sapotra legislative assembly constituency had total 1,82,827 electors. Total number of valid vote was 1,16,062. Bahujan Samaj Party candidate Ramesh Chand Meena won and became MLA from this seat. He secured total 37,878 votes. Indian National Congress candidate Mukhraj stood second with total 29,549 votes. He lost by 8,329 votes.

References

Assembly constituencies of Rajasthan
Karauli district